Czechoslovakia competed at the 1936 Winter Olympics in Garmisch-Partenkirchen, Germany.

Alpine skiing

Bobsleigh

Cross-country skiing

Figure skating

Ice hockey

 Roster:
 Goalkeepers: Jan Peka, Josef Boháč
 Defenders: Jaroslav Pušbauer, Jan Košek, Karel Hromádka
 Forwards: Josef Maleček (5 goals scored), Jiří Tožička (1), Oldřich Kučera (4), Ladislav Troják, Zdeněk Jirotka (3), Drahoš Jirotka (3), Alois Cetkovský, Walter Ullrich

First round
Group C

Second round
Group B

Final round

The second-round game against the United States was carried over to the final round.

Nordic combined

Ski jumping

Speed skating

Men

References

Nations at the 1936 Winter Olympics
1936
Olympics, Winter